Region 2 is the name of a Statistics Canada census division, one of six in the Northwest Territories, Canada. It was introduced in the 2011 census, along with Regions 1, 3, 4, 5 and 6, resulting in the abolition of the former census divisions of Fort Smith Region and Inuvik Region (the latter not to be confused with the modern-day administrative region of the same name). Unlike in some other provinces, census divisions do not reflect the organization of local government in the Northwest Territories. These areas exist solely for the purposes of statistical analysis and presentation; they have no government of their own.

Its territorial extent coincides very closely with the Sahtu Region administrative region.

Main languages in the Region include English (71.6%) and Slavey (25.9%)

Demographics 

Communities

Towns
Norman Wells
Hamlets
Tulita
Chartered communities
Deline
Fort Good Hope
Settlements
Colville Lake

References

Sahtu Region
Census divisions of the Canadian territories